Logan Hunter Sargeant (born December 31, 2000) is an American racing driver who competes in Formula One for Williams Racing. He previously competed in the 2022 FIA Formula 2 Championship driving for Carlin Motorsport, where he became the Rookie of the Year by finishing fourth overall in the standings.

Early career

Karting career 
Sargeant began his motorsport career in karting in 2008. In his first year, he competed in the Rotax Micro Max class in regional and national championships, finishing third in the Florida Winter Tour and the Rotax Max Challenge USA. Sargeant later moved to Europe, where he competed in the ROK Cup International Final, Trofeo Delle Industrie, and WSK Euro Series. 

In 2015, Sargeant won the CIK-FIA World KFJ Championship, becoming the first American to win an FIA Karting World Championship title since Lake Speed in 1978. Sargeant secured his first senior karting title in the 2016 WSK Champions Cup, where he competed in the OK class.

Lower Formula Series 

In the winter of 2016-17, Sargeant made his single-seater debut in the Formula 4 UAE Championship with Team Motopark. Although he did not win any races, he was on the podium in fifteen of the eighteen official races and finished second behind teammate Jonathan Aberdein. In 2017, Sargeant joined Carlin to run the F4 British Championship. Having won two races at Rockingham Motor Speedway and Silverstone, the American finished third in the standings behind his teammate Oscar Piastri and the dominant champion Jamie Caroline.

Formula Renault Eurocup 

In 2018, Sargeant made the full-time switch to the Formula Renault Eurocup with R-ace GP. In the season opener at Paul Ricard he won his first race of his Eurocup career, and later in the season the American added victories at the Nürburgring and the season finale in Barcelona. With 218 points, Sargeant finished fourth behind Max Fewtrell, Christian Lundgaard and Ye Yifei. He also finished second behind Lundgaard in the rookie championship.

FIA Formula 3 Championship

2019 

In 2019, Sargeant returned to Carlin, this time in the FIA Formula 3 Championship. The American scored points on four occasions and finished 19th in the championship; his teammates, Felipe Drugovich and Teppei Natori, finished 16th and 24th respectively.

2020 
For the 2020 season, Sargeant switched to Prema Racing, partnering Frederik Vesti and former British F4 rival Piastri.  After three podiums, the American scored his first FIA F3 victory in the second feature race at Silverstone, as a result of which he also came into the lead of the championship. Sargeant's next win came in Belgium, where he won the sprint race. However, he only managed to score eight points in the final two rounds of the series. Sargeant finished third in the standings, one point behind runner-up Théo Pourchaire and only four points behind his teammate Piastri.

2021 

On February 10, 2021, Sargeant announced that he would not progress to the FIA Formula 2 Championship, citing financial reasons. In April, he took part in a pre-season F3 test with Charouz Racing System. Following that, he was announced as a driver for Charouz in the 2021 FIA Formula 3 Championship. The first third of the season saw Sargeant score a pair of fourth-place finishes, including as a podium at the Red Bull Ring, which he lost post-race due to track limit violations. His first podium of the season came in the first race in Budapest, and he followed that up with another third place in Belgium. At the first Zandvoort race, Sargeant scored his season's best finish up to that moment, ending up second after having started from reversed-grid pole. Finally, the American achieved his only win of the season at the first race of the final round at Sochi Autodrom, thus giving Charouz their first victory in Formula 3. Sargeant finished the campaign in seventh place with 102 points.

FIA Formula 2 Championship

2021: FIA Formula 2 debut 
Sargeant made his FIA Formula 2 Championship debut in the penultimate round of the 2021 season with HWA Racelab. He finished the first race in 16th, but retired in the second sprint due to a mechanical problem. The American ended the aborted feature race in 14th position.

2022 

On December 13, 2021, Sargeant was announced to be driving for Carlin in the 2022 season alongside New Zealander Liam Lawson.

On July 3, 2022, Sargeant became the first American driver to win a Formula 2 race when he won the feature Race at the British Grand Prix.

On July 10, 2022, Sargeant won the Austria F2 feature race after two drivers in front of the American driver were penalized after the chequered flag.

Formula One 
In October 2021, on the weekend of the United States Grand Prix, Sargeant was announced to be joining the Williams Driver Academy. He got his first taste of F1 machinery at the post-season test driving the Williams FW43B on the Yas Marina Circuit. He described his first time in an F1 car as an "experience of a lifetime."

Sargeant made his Formula One practice debut with Williams at the 2022 United States Grand Prix. He was the first American driver to take part in a weekend session since Alexander Rossi in 2015. On his free practice debut, Jost Capito, Williams' team principal, stated that his debut "was a pleasure and pressure for Sargeant".

Williams (2023–) 
On the weekend of the 2022 United States Grand Prix, Capito confirmed that Sargeant would be driving for the British constructor in 2023 if he obtained the necessary Super Licence points, which was to finish at least fifth (or sixth without any penalty points) in the F2 championship. Capito also mentioned that his US nationality was not key to the American's promotion. Sargeant officially clinched the required super licence points following F2's Abu Dhabi feature race. He is set to secure more F1 mileage over the winter with Alpine, driving the A521.

On November 21, 2022, it was announced that Sargeant would be driving alongside Alexander Albon, replacing Canadian Nicholas Latifi for the 2023 season.

Following the end of the 2022 season, Sargeant participated in post-season testing with the Williams FW44 in Abu Dhabi.

Sargeant qualified 16th at the season opener in Bahrain, setting an identical time to McLaren's Lando Norris. However, as Norris had set his lap time first, he advanced to Q2. In the race, Sargeant finished 12th, two places behind his teammate.

Karting record

Karting career summary

Racing record

Racing career summary

† As Sargeant was a guest driver, he was ineligible for points.
 Season still in progress.

Complete Formula 4 UAE Championship results 
(key) (Races in bold indicate pole position; races in italics indicate fastest lap)

Complete F4 British Championship results
(key) (Races in bold indicate pole position) (Races in italics indicate fastest lap)

Complete Formula Renault Eurocup results
(key) (Races in bold indicate pole position) (Races in italics indicate fastest lap)

† As Sargeant was a guest driver, he was ineligible for points.

Complete FIA Formula 3 Championship results
(key) (Races in bold indicate pole position; races in italics indicate points for the fastest lap of top ten finishers)

† Driver did not finish the race, but were classified, as they completed more than 90% of the race distance.
‡ Half points awarded as less than 75% of race distance was completed.

Complete Macau Grand Prix results

Complete European Le Mans Series results
(key) (Races in bold indicate pole position; results in italics indicate fastest lap)

Complete FIA Formula 2 Championship results 
(key) (Races in bold indicate pole position) (Races in italics indicate points for the fastest lap of top ten finishers)

Complete Formula One results 
(key) (Races in bold indicate pole position) (Races in italics indicate fastest lap)

 Season still in progress.

References

External links
 

2000 births
Living people
Racing drivers from Florida
Racing drivers from Miami
FIA Formula 3 Championship drivers
Motopark Academy drivers
Carlin racing drivers
Prema Powerteam drivers
Charouz Racing System drivers
FIA Formula 2 Championship drivers
HWA Team drivers
Sportspeople from Fort Lauderdale, Florida
British F4 Championship drivers
Formula Renault Eurocup drivers
Formula Renault 2.0 NEC drivers
European Le Mans Series drivers
R-ace GP drivers
Karting World Championship drivers
American Formula One drivers
UAE F4 Championship drivers
Le Mans Cup drivers
Iron Lynx drivers
Williams Formula One drivers